Morteza Azimaei Divkolaei (born 11 September 1982) is an Iranian professional futsal coach and former player.

Honours

Country 
 AFC Futsal Championship
 Champion (1): 2005
 Asian Indoor Games
 Champion (1): 2005
 Confederations Cup
 Champion (1): 2009
 Grand Prix de Futsal
 Runner-up (1): 2009

Club 
AFC Futsal Club Championship
 Runners-up (1): 2011 (Shahid Mansouri)
 Iranian Futsal Super League
 Champion (2): 2010–11 (Shahid Mansouri) - 2011–12 (Shahid Mansouri)

Individual 
 Top Goalscorer:
 Iranian Futsal Super League: 2008–09 (Shahrvand) (32 goals)

References

1982 births
Living people
People from Babol
Iranian men's futsal players
Futsal forwards
Shahrvand Sari FSC players
Shahid Mansouri FSC players
Iranian expatriate futsal players
Iranian expatriate sportspeople in Lebanon
Expatriate futsal players in Lebanon
Iranian futsal coaches
Sportspeople from Mazandaran province